Hamptons is a magazine founded by Randy Schindler in 1978 and published thirteen times throughout the year focused on real estate, interior design, fashion, art, culture, dining, entertainment, fitness, and philanthropy. The magazine was subsequently published by Niche Media, which was founded in 1998 by Jason Binn, and has an approximate circulation of 40,000 – 50,000 copies, distributed all over The Hamptons.

Niche Media was renamed GreenGale Publishing in 2015. GreenGale was acquired by Modern Luxury in 2017. In February 2018, Anetta Nowosielska was named as the editor-in-chief of the magazine.

References

External links
 Hamptons magazine official website

1978 establishments in New York (state)
Design magazines
Entertainment magazines published in the United States
Magazines established in 1978
Magazines published in New York (state)
Local interest magazines published in the United States
Visual arts magazines published in the United States